Revathi Sankaran  is an Indian television personality, actress and Harikatha storyteller.

Career
In 2010, she received Kalaimamani award.

Television
 Marmadesam
 Anni
 Kasalavu Nesam as Mohana (Gautham's mother)
 Mangayar Choice Sun TV, 2000 - 2008
 Alli Darbar
 Jannal - Ammavukku Rendula Ragu
 Jannal - Adutha veettu kavithaigal 
 Paatti Vaithiyam Vijay TV International Channel
 Kalyana Parisu
 Pathi Vaithiyam

Filmography 
All films are in Tamil.

References

Television personalities from Tamil Nadu
Living people
Tamil television actresses
Actresses in Tamil cinema
Indian film actresses
Recipients of the Kalaimamani Award
Indian storytellers
20th-century Indian actresses
21st-century Indian actresses
Indian television actresses
Actresses in Tamil television
Year of birth missing (living people)